is a Japanese video board game for the Super Famicom, developed and published by Human Entertainment and released in 1994.

References

External links
 ただいま勇者募集中おかわり at super-famicom.jp 

1994 video games
Human Entertainment games
Japan-exclusive video games
Super Nintendo Entertainment System games
Super Nintendo Entertainment System-only games
Digital tabletop games
Video games developed in Japan
Multiplayer and single-player video games